One's on the Way is the nineteenth solo studio album by American country music singer-songwriter Loretta Lynn. It was released on March 6, 1972, by Decca Records.

Critical reception

In the issue dated April 15, 1972, Billboard published a review that said, "Ms. Lynn's latest LP is an agreeable coupling of some well-known and some not-so-well-known contemporary country material. In her own winning style she offers Ray Griff's "The Morning After Baby Let Me Down"" and Conway Twitty's "I Can't See Me Without You". Programmers should be aware of "L-O-V-E, Love" and "It's Not the Miles I've Traveled". Also included is her recent No. 1 country smash.

Cashbox published a review in the March 18 issue which said, "This one's on the way for Loretta Lynn! Her new album, revolving around her recent hit single, is bound to take off for the top and stay there for quite a while. Her clean and simple style and direct approach to tasteful material has made her a hallmark in C&W circles for the last decade. And she keeps getting better and better. In addition to the title tune, this LP features Ray Griff's "The Morning After Baby Let Me Down" and fine versions of "Blueberry Hill" and "He's All I Got" (popularized by Johnny Paycheck as "She's All I Got")."

Commercial performance 
The album peaked at No. 3 on the US Billboard Hot Country LP's chart and No. 109 on the US Billboard Top LP's & Tape chart.

The album's only single, "One's on the Way", was released in November 1971 and topped the US Billboard Hot Country Singles chart. The single also peaked at No. 1 in Canada on the RPM Country Singles chart.

Recording 
Recording sessions for the album took place on January 18, 19 and 20, 1972, at Bradley's Barn in Mount Juliet, Tennessee. Two songs on the album were recorded during sessions for previous albums. The title track, "One's on the Way", was recorded on August 3, 1971, during the sessions for 1971's You're Lookin' at Country. "L-O-V-E, Love" was recorded during the November 18, 1968 session for 1969's Your Squaw Is on the Warpath.

Track listing

Personnel
Adapted from the album liner notes and Decca recording session records.
Larry Barbier – photography
Harold Bradley – bass guitar, electric bass guitar
Owen Bradley – producer
Floyd Cramer – piano
Ray Edenton – guitar, acoustic guitar
Buddy Harman – drums
Junior Huskey – bass
Darrell Johnson – mastering
The Jordanaires – background vocals
Loretta Lynn – lead vocals
Grady Martin – guitar, lead electric guitar
Bob Moore – bass
Hargus Robbins – piano
Hal Rugg – steel
Dave Thornhill – guitar
Don Willis – liner notes

Charts 
Album

Singles

References 

1971 albums
Loretta Lynn albums
Albums produced by Owen Bradley
Decca Records albums